Marie-Christine Fillou née Bourbon (born 3 July 1961) is a retired French para table tennis player. She is a Paralympic bronze medalist and a double European silver medalist.

References

External links 
 
 

1961 births
Living people
Paralympic table tennis players of France
Table tennis players at the 2008 Summer Paralympics
Table tennis players at the 2012 Summer Paralympics
Medalists at the 2008 Summer Paralympics
French female table tennis players
Paralympic medalists in table tennis
Paralympic bronze medalists for France
20th-century French women
21st-century French women